The Anchor Brewery was a brewery in Park Street, Southwark, London, England. Established in 1616, by the early nineteenth century it was the largest brewery in the world. From 1781 it was operated by Barclay Perkins & Co, who in 1955 merged with the Courage Brewery, which already owned the nearby Anchor Brewhouse. The Park Street brewery was demolished in 1981.

History 

The brewery was established in 1616 by James Monger Sr. in Southwark, on land adjacent to the Globe Theatre. On his death, the brewery passed to his godson, James Monger Jr. James Child acquired the brewery after the younger Monger's death in 1670, and owned it until his death in 1696. His son in law, Edmund Halsey, managed the business with James Child from 1693, and subsequently as sole proprietor until his death in 1729. The brewery was then purchased by Ralph Thrale, the brewery manager and a nephew of Halsey, for £30,000 in instalments over 11 years.

Barclay Perkins & Co was founded in July 1781 after chief clerk John Perkins and Robert Barclay (of the banking family) acquired the Anchor Brewery from Henry Thrale's widow, Hester for £135,000, to be paid over four years. In 1782, 85,700 barrels were brewed.

By 1809 the venture had an annual output of 260,000 barrels, making it the largest brewery in the world. Between 1809 and 1853 the Anchor had the largest output of any brewery in London. The brewery produced exclusively porter until 1834, when it began to brew pale ale.

A fire at the brewery in May 1832, caused £40,000 worth of damage, destroying many buildings and resulting in considerable rebuilding of the site. The new brewery attracted considerable interest: visitors included the Prince of Wales, the German statesman Otto von Bismarck, Prince Louis-Napoléon Bonaparte, Ibrahim Pasha of Egypt, the Austrian general Julius Jacob von Haynau, who was attacked by draymen while touring the brewery in 1850, and the Italian nationalist Giuseppe Garibaldi in 1864.

In 1867, Barclay Perkins brewed 423,000 barrels.

Barclay Perkins was an early adoptor of lager production in the UK, with the Anchor brewing lager from 1922.

In 1955, Barclay Perkins merged with rival London brewer Courage. Brewing continued at the Anchor site until the early 1970s. In 1981 the brewery buildings were demolished, although the former brewery tap, the Anchor Tavern, remains.

The brewery was well known for its Russian Imperial Stout, which continued to be brewed by Courage and later Scottish & Newcastle until 1993.

The nearby Anchor Terrace was built in 1834, after the fire of 1832, for senior employees of the brewery and stands on top of William Shakespeare's original Globe Theatre.

See also 
 Henry Thrale
 Anchor Brewhouse
 Anchor Bankside

References

Further reading 
 For more information, see 
 Days at the Factories, George Dodd (1843)
 "Barclay, Perkins & Co", unsigned, illustrated article in Westcott Local History Group Annual Report for 2004, pp. 17 – 22. This article tells the history of the family of Robert Barclay (1751 – 1830) and their home, Bury Hill, Westcott, a village to the West of Dorking.
 Milligan, Edward H (2007). The Biographical Dictionary of British Quakers in Commerce and Industry 1775-1920. York, UK: William Sessions Limited. Pages 31/33 and  Articles on Robert Barclay (1751 – 1830), Charles Barclay (1780 – 1855)

External links

 History of the Anchor Brewery - its sale
 Barclay, Perkins & Co.
 Survey of London: volume 22: Bankside (the parishes of St. Saviour and Christchurch Southwark) edited by Sir Howard Roberts and Walter H. Godfrey 1950. Pages 78-80: Chapter 9 - The Anchor Brewery
 

Buildings and structures in the London Borough of Southwark
Breweries in London
1981 disestablishments in England
1616 establishments in England
British companies disestablished in 1981
Buildings and structures demolished in 1981
Demolished buildings and structures in London